Kevin Andrew Murphy is an American novelist and game writer from Northern California.

Education
He is a graduate of University of California at Santa Cruz and has a Master of Arts from University of Southern California.

Career
He has written gamebooks for Steve Jackson Games and White Wolf. He is one of the contributors to the Wild Cards book series edited by George R. R. Martin. His first solo novel, Penny Dreadful, was released in 2007. He is also the designer of several fonts on the theme of witchcraft for Scriptorium Fonts.

He wrote the essay "Unseen Horrors and Shadowy Manipulations" in the compilation Seven Seasons of Buffy: Science Fiction and Fantasy Writers Discuss Their Favorite Television Show. In a review in School Library Journal, Christine C. Menefee says his essay "documents instances of censorship and the attempts of network and advertisers to reshape Buffy to suit their purposes."

He completed the novel Drum into Silence (2002) posthumously for Jo Clayton.

His work has been published in the Shit Creek Review.

He has worked as a staff type designer for Scriptorium Fonts.

Bibliography

Novels
House of Secrets (w/ James A. Moore, 1995)
Penny Dreadful (1996)
Fathom Book 1: The World Below (2002)
Drum Into Silence (w/ Jo Clayton, 2002)

Wild Cards universe
"Cursum Perficio" (in Card Sharks, 1993)
"With a Flourish and a Flair" (in Deuces Down, 2002)
"The Tears of Nepthys" (in Busted Flush (2008))
Mississippi Roll (w/ David D. Levine, Cherie Priest, Stephen Leigh, Carrie Vaughn, John J. Miller, 2017)
 Low Chicago (w/ Paul Cornell, Saladin Ahmed, Marko Kloos, John J. Miller, Mary Anne Mohanraj, Christopher Rowe, Melinda M. Snodgrass, 2018)
A Flint Lies in the Mud and  But a Flint Holds Fire (in Knaves Over Queens, 2018)

Short fiction
"Masquerade" (1994)
"The Mercury of the Wise" (1994)
"Ties That Bind" (1994)
"I'll Give You Three Wishes...." (1995)
"A Cup of Honeysuckle" (1995)
"Sealskin" (1995)
"The Croquet Mallet Murders" (1995)
"The Dark of the Year" (1995)
"Headturner" (w/ Thomas S. Roche, 1995)
"Silver Nutmeg, Golden Pear" (w/ James A. Moore, in Truth Until Paradox, 1995)
"Grim Reminders" (w/ James A. Moore, in Truth Until Paradox, 1995) 
"Dead and Gone" (1996)
"Stereopticon" (1997)
"The Red Elixir" (1997)
"The Nightwatch Is a Lonely Vigil" (1997)
"Death for Death" (w/ Lillian Csernica, 1998)
"Special Interests" (w/ Lillian Csernica, 1998)
"The Five Petals of the Lotus" (1998)
"Baubles, Bangles and Beads" (in Chicks 'n Chained Males, 1999)
"Ferdinand Feghoot and the Zero-G Nunnery" (w/ Fred Flaxman, 2002))
"Gingerbread Recipe Number 13" (in Hastur Pussycat, Kill Kill, 2004)
"Tacos for Tezcatlipoca" (2009)
"Frijoles for Fenris" (2009)
"Tecate for Hecate" (2010)
"The Restless Armadillo" (w/ Lillian Csernica, 2014)
"Tea Smoke" (2017)

Gamebook (partial)
Aces Abroad, a supplement for GURPS Wild Cards(1991).
The Quintessential World of Darkness (1998)
Guide to the Traditions (2001)

References

Other sources

External links
Kevin Andrew Murphy's Homepage

Article on his font designs

American fantasy writers
American male novelists
Living people
Role-playing game designers
Role-playing game writers
University of California, Santa Cruz alumni
University of Southern California alumni
Year of birth missing (living people)